Nauru competed at the 2017 Asian Indoor and Martial Arts Games held in Ashgabat, Turkmenistan from September 17 to 27. 9 participants competed in 3 different sports. Nauru did not win any medals in the multi-sport event.

Nauru made its debut in an Asian Indoor and Martial Arts Games at the competition held in Turkmenistan along with other Oceania nations.

Participants

Indoor Athletics

Nauru participated in indoor athletics.

Key
Note–Ranks given for track events are within the athlete's heat only
Q = Qualified for the next round
q = Qualified for the next round as a fastest loser or, in field events, by position without achieving the qualifying target
qR = Qualified to the next round by referee judgement
NR = National record
N/A = Round not applicable for the event
Bye = Athlete not required to compete in round

Track & road events
Men

Weightlifting

Nauru participated in weightlifting.

Men

Women

Wrestling

Nauru participated in wrestling.

Key:
 VT (ranking points: 5–0 or 0–5) – Victory by fall.
 VB (ranking points: 5–0 or 0–5) – Victory by injury (VF for forfeit, VA for withdrawal or disqualification)
 PP (ranking points: 3–1 or 1–3) – Decision by points – the loser with technical points.
 PO (ranking points: 3–0 or 0–3) – Decision by points – the loser without technical points.
 ST (ranking points: 4–0 or 0–4) – Great superiority – the loser without technical points and a margin of victory of at least 8 (Greco-Roman) or 10 (freestyle) points.
 SP (ranking points: 4–1 or 1–4) – Technical superiority – the loser with technical points and a margin of victory of at least 8 (Greco-Roman) or 10 (freestyle) points.

Men

References 

2017 in Nauruan sport
Nations at the 2017 Asian Indoor and Martial Arts Games